Pavel Pumprla (born 13 June 1986) is a Czech professional basketball player for USK Praha of the Czech NBL. He also represents the senior Czech Republic national team.

Professional career
While playing with the Czech Republic club Basketball Nymburk, Pumprla was named to the European-wide secondary level EuroCup's All-EuroCup Second Team in 2012. In August 2012, he signed with the Spanish League club Obradoiro CAB, for the 2012–13 season. In April 2013, he re-signed with them for one more season.

On 8 October 2015, he signed with the Belgian League club Spirou Charleroi. On February 10, 2016, he left Charleroi, and signed with the Spanish club Estudiantes, for the rest of the season. On 19 August 2016, Pumprla returned to ČEZ Nymburk. After four seasons with the team, he signed with the Czech club USK Praha, on August 21, 2020.

National team career
Pumprla has been a member of the senior Czech national team. He played with the Czech Republic at the 2013 EuroBasket, the 2015 EuroBasket, the 2016 Belgrade FIBA World Olympic Qualifying Tournament, and the 2019 FIBA World Cup.

References

External links

FIBA.com Profile
FIBA Europe Profile
EuroCup Profile
FIBA Champions League Profile
Spanish League Archive Profile 

1986 births
Living people
2019 FIBA Basketball World Cup players
Basketball Nymburk players
BK Opava players
CB Estudiantes players
Czech expatriate basketball people in Spain
Czech men's basketball players
Liga ACB players
Obradoiro CAB players
People from Zábřeh
Shooting guards
Small forwards
Spirou Charleroi players
Sportspeople from the Olomouc Region